Affendi bin Haji Buang (born 21 August 1962) is a Malaysian Air Force General who serves as the 21st Chief of Defence Forces. Prior to his assignment, he previously served as the Chief of Air Force.

Background
He was born at Kuching, Sarawak on 21 August 1962. He finished his early education at his hometown, and completed his education at the Royal Military College,  at Sungai Besi, until he finished his Malaysian Certificate of Examination in 1979.

He joined the Malaysian Armed Forces in 1980 as an RMAF Officer Cadet, and received his basic training at the Officer Cadet School, Sebatang Kara, at Port Dickson. He was commissioned as a Second Lieutenant in 1982, and was assigned to No 3 Flying Training Centre at Sultan Haji Ahmad Shah Airport in Kuantan.

He attended various courses and seminars in the country and abroad, such as the Malaysian Armed Forces Staff College in 1997, the Defences and Strategic Studies Course at the Centre for Defence and Strategic Studies at Australia in 2005, and the Royal College of Defence Studies at London in 2011.
He also holds a Master of Art (Strategic Studies) at the Deakin University, Australia.

A trained and skilled fighter pilot, he flew various aircraft including the Aermacchi MB-339, the Douglas A-4 Skyhawk, and the Mikoyan MiG-29, and performed various air support and interdiction missions. He was also among the founding officers of the "Smokey Bandits" Aerobatics Team. He rose through the ranks until he was promoted as the Director General for Operations and Exercises, RMAF Air Operations Command in 2014, became the Deputy Chief of the Air Force in 2015, became the Chief of Air Force in 2016–2020, and became the Chief of Defence Forces on January 2, 2020.

Honours
:
 Recipient of the Air Force Medal (PTU) (1990)
 Commander of the Order of Loyalty to the Crown of Malaysia (PSM) – Tan Sri (2017)
 Commander of the Order of the Defender of the Realm (PMN) – Tan Sri (2020)
 Malaysian Armed Forces
 Officer of the Most Gallant Order of Military Service (KAT)
 Warrior of the Most Gallant Order of Military Service (PAT)
 Loyal Commander of the Most Gallant Order of Military Service (PSAT)
 Courageous Commander of the Most Gallant Order of Military Service (PGAT)
  :
  Knight Grand Commander of the Order of Taming Sari (SPTS) – Dato’ Seri Panglima (2020)
:
 Knight Grand Commander of the Order of the Noble Crown of Kelantan (SPKK) – Dato’ (2018)
:
  Knight Commander of the Order of the Defender of State (DPPN) – Dato’ Seri (2019)
:
 Knight Commander of the Order of the Star of Sarawak (PNBS) – Dato Sri (2020)
:
 Grand Commander of the Exalted Order of Malacca (DGSM) – Datuk Seri (2020)
:
 Member of the Order of the Crown of Pahang (AMP)
 Companion of the Order of Sultan Ahmad Shah of Pahang (SAP)
 Knight Companion of the Order of the Crown of Pahang (DIMP) – Dato' (2008)
 Grand Knight of the Order of Sultan Ahmad Shah of Pahang (SSAP) – Dato' Sri (2014)

Foreign honours
 :
  Recipient of the Darjah Utama Bakti Cemerlang (Tentera) (DUBC) (16 February 2022)
 :
  First Class of the Order of Paduka Keberanian Laila Terbilang (DPKT) – Dato Paduka Seri (15 July 2022).

References

1962 births
Living people
People from Sarawak
Royal Malaysian Air Force personnel
21st-century Malaysian people
Commanders of the Order of Loyalty to the Crown of Malaysia
Commanders of the Order of the Defender of the Realm
Knights Commander of the Most Exalted Order of the Star of Sarawak